Wallingford station is a train station on the New Haven–Springfield Line located in Wallingford, Connecticut. A new station with high-level platforms opened on November 6, 2017 to the north of the original station. The former station building is listed on the National Register of Historic Places as Wallingford Railroad Station.

History 

The depot at Wallingford was built in 1871 by the Hartford & New Haven Railroad on the Springfield Line, and was built in a French Second Empire style similar to that of the Windsor train station.

The original station building was closed to the public in 1994 and is now used for adult education and the New Haven Model Railroad Club. The line through Wallingford was double-tracked until 1990 when the second track was removed. The original Wallingford station building has been listed on the National Register of Historic Places since 1993.

A temporary platform replaced the former station platform on April 25, 2016. The temporary platform was used until the new station was completed.

In fall 2016, the Wallingford Planning and Zoning Commission adopted a Transit-Oriented Development Plan, which outlined recommendations for development and infrastructure changes around the station. The existing commercial, industrial zone near the station, as part of the plan, will be replaced with medium- and high-density residential zoning. New commercial and residential development will be encouraged near the station and improvements will be made in the area of the station to connect to downtown Wallingford.

Wallingford has two high-level side platforms serving both tracks, each 6 cars long. The new station, which cost about $21 million to construct, opened on November 6, 2017.

See also
National Register of Historic Places listings in New Haven County, Connecticut

References

External links

Wallingford – Hartford Line
Wallingford Amtrak Station (USA Rail Guide -- Train Web)

Amtrak stations in Connecticut
Stations on the New Haven–Springfield Line
Railway stations in the United States opened in 1838
Railway stations in the United States opened in 2017
Buildings and structures in Wallingford, Connecticut
Railway stations on the National Register of Historic Places in Connecticut
Railroad stations in New Haven County, Connecticut
National Register of Historic Places in New Haven County, Connecticut
1871 establishments in Connecticut
2017 establishments in Connecticut